I22 or I 22 may refer to:

 Interstate 22, a highway in the United States
 Värmland Regiment, a Swedish infantry regiment; active 1816–1939
 Lapland Ranger Regiment, a Swedish infantry regiment; active 1975–2000
 , several submarines